Robbin Shipp is a Georgia attorney and former member of the Georgia House of Representatives. She was the Democratic nominee for state Commissioner of Labor in the 2014 election.

Professionally, Shipp has worked as an Assistant District Attorney in Fulton County, Georgia, and as Associate General Counsel for the Grady Health System.
Co-author, Justice While Black, Helping African American Families Navigate and Survive the Criminal Justice System. Agate Publishing, October, 2014
Nominated for a 2015 NAACP Image Award for Excellence in Writing-Instructional.

She is a graduate of Shaw University (BA, Communications), Georgia College and State University (MPA, Political Science) and the Walter F. George School of Law at Mercer University (Juris Doctor).

References

External links
Robbin Shipp for Labor Commissioner campaign site

Living people
Mercer University alumni
Shaw University alumni
Democratic Party members of the Georgia House of Representatives
21st-century American politicians
Year of birth missing (living people)